Baykit Airport  is an airport in Krasnoyarsk Krai, Russia located  west of Baykit. It is a major utilitarian transport airfield.

Airlines and destinations

References

Airports built in the Soviet Union
Airports in Krasnoyarsk Krai